The 1935 Baltic Cup was held in Tallinn, Estonia at Kadrioru staadion on 20–22 August 1935. It was the seventh edition of the tournament. Lithuania won the tournament with a win over Estonia and a draw against Latvia.

Results

Statistics

Goalscorers

See also
Balkan Cup
Nordic Football Championship

References

External links
 Tournament overview at EU-Football.info

1935
1935–36 in European football
1935 in Lithuanian football
1935 in Latvian football
1935 in Estonian football
1935